Barca (Barqa; Berber: Berqa), also called Barce (Bárkē), was an ancient city and former bishopric, which survives as both a Latin Catholic and an Orthodox titular see.

History

Antiquity 

Barca appears to be originally a settlement of the Libyan tribe Barraci. Later, around 560 BC Greek settlers from Cyrene colonized it and it became very powerful. Its name was Barce (Βάρκη). Later it was taken by the Persians, who moved most of its inhabitants to Bactria. Then became a Roman and a Byzantine. It was in the coastal area of what is today Libya. As a Greek city, it was part of the Cyrenaican Pentapolis along with the city of Cyrene itself. Achaemenid king Darius I established Barcaean captives in a village in Bactria, which was still flourishing in Herodotus' time.

According to most archeologists, it was situated at Marj, approximately 100 kilometers northeast of Benghazi, but according to Alexander Graham it was at Tolmeita (Ptolemais). No remains of the ancient settlement are visible at Marj, but some of the finds made there during the Italian colonial dominance of Libya (1913–41) are on display in the museum at Tolmeita.

The city's name, Arabized as Barqah, came to refer to the former state and province of Cyrenaica.

Since the Arab conquest 

Barce was part of the Exarchate of Africa until it was conquered by the Arabs in 643–644 during the Islamic conquest of North Africa. It originally served as the capital of the Barqah province of the Caliphate. When the Ottoman Turks conquered the region in 1521, they used the Turkish form "Barka" for the province, but did not retain the city's status as its capital.

Barca and Christianity 
Early Christianity spread to the Pentapolis of North Africa from Egypt. Synesius of Cyrene (370–414 AD), Bishop of Ptolemais, received his instruction at Alexandria in both the Catechetical School and the Museion, and he retained a great deal of reverence and affection for Hypatia, the last pagan Neoplatonist, whose classes he had attended. Synesius was raised to the episcopate by Theophilus, patriarch of Alexandria, in 410.

In accordance with a ruling of the Council of Nicaea in 325, Cyrenaica is recognized as ecclesiastically dependent on the See of Alexandria. Pentapolis is therefore included in the titles used both by the patriarch of the Coptic Church and by the Greek Orthodox Patriarch of Alexandria.

Although it was often destroyed and then restored during the Roman period, becoming a mere borough, Barca was, nevertheless, the seat of a bishopric. The bishops who participated in the First Council of Nicaea in 325 included the Arian Zopyros of Barca. Zenobius signed the acts of the Council of Ephesus in 431 and Theodorus took part in the Robber Council of Ephesus in 449, whose decisions were overthrown by the Council of Chalcedon in 451.

Orthodox titular see 
The Metropolitan of Western Pentapolis held the most senior position in the Holy Synod of the Coptic Orthodox Church after that of the Pope of Alexandria. Since the demise of that eparchy as a major Archiepiscopal Metropolis in the days of Pope John VI of Alexandria, the position is held as a titular see attached to another Diocese.

Latin catholic titular see 
Also for the Catholic Church, Barca, no longer a residential bishopric, is today listed as a titular see. Over the past century there have been 11 bishops of the Catholic titular See. The most recent has been Andraos Salama prior to his appointment as bishop of the Coptic Catholic Eparchy of Giza.

See also 
 Apollonia
 Ptolemais

References

Sources and references 

 
 Butler, The Arab Conquest of Egypt, p. 430
 Heinrich Gelzer, Patrum Nicaenorum nomina, p. 231
 Marquardt, Staatsverwaltung, I, p. 459
 Westermann, Großer Atlas zur Weltgeschichte (in German)

Ancient Cyrenaica
Populated coastal places in Libya
Former populated places in Libya
Populated places of the Byzantine Empire
Catholic titular sees in Africa
Greek colonies in Libya